INS Nirghat (K89) was a  of the Indian Navy.

INS Nirghat was a part of the 25th "Killer" Missile Squadron of the Indian Navy.

Operation Trident

During the Indo-Pakistani War of 1971, INS Nirghat was part of the Operation Trident strike force, along with her sister vessels from the 25th Killer Squadron ( and ). On the afternoon of 4 December 1971, the strike group made its way towards Karachi. Nirghat launched two SS-N-2 Styx missiles at Khaibar, sinking her.

Other vessels of the strike group sank the Pakistan Navy minesweeper  and the merchant ship MV Venus Challenger.

Lieutenant Commander Inderjit Sharma, the commanding officer, and Master Chief Petty Officer M. N. Sangal of Nirghat were awarded the Vir Chakra for their roles during the operation.

References

Vidyut-class missile boats
Fast attack craft of the Indian Navy